
Rzeszów County is a unit of territorial administration and local government (powiat) in Subcarpathian Voivodeship, south-eastern Poland. It came into being on January 1, 1999, as a result of the Polish local government reforms passed in 1998. Its administrative seat is the city of Rzeszów, although the city is not part of the county (it constitutes a separate city county).

As of 2019 its total population is 168,614, out of which the population of Boguchwała is 6,179, that of Głogów Małopolski is 6,654, that of Sokołów Małopolski is 4,193, that of Tyczyn is 3,824, that of Błażowa is 2,139, and the rural population is 139,496.

Neighbouring counties
Apart from the city of Rzeszów, Rzeszów County is also bordered by Nisko County to the north, Leżajsk County to the north-east, Łańcut County, Przeworsk County and Przemyśl County to the east, Brzozów County to the south, Strzyżów County to the south-west, Ropczyce-Sędziszów County to the west, and Kolbuszowa County to the north-west.

Administrative division
The county is subdivided into 14 gminas (one urban, five urban-rural and eight rural). These are listed in the following table, in descending order of population.

References

External links

 
Land counties of Podkarpackie Voivodeship